Daone (Daùn in local dialect) was a comune (municipality) in Trentino in the northern Italian region Trentino-Alto Adige/Südtirol, located about  southwest of Trento.

It was merged with Bersone and Praso on January 1, 2015, to form a new municipality, Valdaone.

Daone borders the following municipalities: Spiazzo, Strembo, Saviore dell'Adamello, Massimeno, Pelugo, Cevo, Villa Rendena, Breguzzo, Creto, Roncone, Praso, Lardaro, Breno, Bersone, Condino, Castel Condino and Cimego.

Demographic evolution

References

Cities and towns in Trentino-Alto Adige/Südtirol
Valdaone